Trametes suaveolens is a species of fungus belonging to the family Polyporaceae.

Synonym:
 Boletus suaveolens L., 1753 (= basionym)

References

Polyporaceae